Neomegamelanus is a genus of delphacid planthoppers in the family Delphacidae. There are about five described species in Neomegamelanus.

Species
 Neomegamelanus elongatus (Ball, 1905)
 Neomegamelanus graminicola (Muir, 1928)
 Neomegamelanus lautus (Metcalf, 1923)
 Neomegamelanus penilautus McDermott, 1952
 Neomegamelanus spartini (Osborn, 1905)

References

Further reading

External links

 

Auchenorrhyncha genera
Delphacinae